Premio México de Ciencia y Tecnología is an award bestowed in by the CONACYT to Ibero-American (Latin America plus the Iberian Peninsula) scholars in recognition of advances in  science and/or technology. In the selection of the recipients the work done on institutions located in Ibero-America is deemed particularly meriting.

Award winners
Jacinto Convit, 1990
Juan José Giambiagi, 1991
Johanna Döbereiner, 1992
José Leite Lopes, 1993
Ignacio Rodriguez-Iturbe, 1994
José Luis Massera, 1997
Margarita Salas Falgueras, 1998
Sergio Enrique Ferreira, 1999
Jacob Palis, Jr., 2000
Ricardo Bressani Castignoli, 2001
Martín Schmal, 2002
Constantino Tsallis, 2003
Ginés Morata Pérez, 2004
Avelino Corma Canós, 2005
Antonio García-Bellido y García de Diego, 2006
Ramón Latorre de la Cruz, 2007
Mayana Zatz, 2008
Miguel Ángel Alario y Franco, 2009
Boaventura de Sousa Santos, 2010
Carlos López Otín, 2011
Juan Carlos Castilla Zenobi, 2012
Víctor Alberto Ramos, 2013
Carlos Martínez Alonso, 2014
Andrés Moya, 2015
Rafael Radi Isola, 2016
María Ángela Nieto Toledano, 2017
José W. F. Valle, 2018

See also
CONACYT
History of science and technology in Mexico
National Prize for Arts and Sciences

References

1990 establishments in Mexico
Academic awards
Awards established in 1990
International awards
Science and technology in Mexico
Science and technology awards